Dokdonella soli is a Gram-negative, aerobic and rod-shaped bacterium from the genus of Dokdonella which has been isolated from soil from the island of Ulleung in Korea.

References

Xanthomonadales
Bacteria described in 2009